The Itigi-Sumbu thicket is an ecoregion consisting of two small areas of thick shrubland in Tanzania, Zambia and the adjacent Democratic Republic of the Congo, in East Africa.  The floral community of dense deciduous brush is unique, with many endemic species, and almost no transition zone between it and the surrounding dry miombo woodlands.  The distinctive nature of this small region is partly due to its setting on dry alluvial soil over a hard duricrust, while the surrounding areas are rocky hills and plateaus.

Location and description
The thickets are found in the flatland between Lake Mweru Wantipa and Lake Tanganyika in Zambia (between 950 m and 1,200 m above sea level), and near the town of Itigi in the Itigi District of Tanzania. The climate consists of a cool dry season from May to August, a hot dry season from August to November, and a rainy season from November to April.

Climate
The climate of the ecoregion is hot semi-arid (Köppen climate classification (BSh)). This climate is characteristic of steppes, with hot summers and cool or mild winters, and minimal precipitation.  The dry season (May to October) averages , and the wet season rising above . The rainy season is November to April. Rainfall differs in the two different sites of this ecoregion, averaging 1,400 mm/year in the Zambian site, but less than 500 mm/year in the Tanzanian site.

Flora
The extremely dense, impenetrable Itigi deciduous thicket is a unique mixture of over 100 species of woody shrubs 3 to 5 meters high.  Characteristics species are two species of Baphia (Baphia burttii and Baphia massaiensis), Bussea massaiensis, Burttia prunoides, Combretum celastroides (a type of bushwillow), Grewia burttii, Pseudoprosopsis fischeri, and Tapiphyllum floribundum.

Fauna
Traditionally habitat of elephant and black rhino the area is vulnerable to poaching and the rhino have been eradicated from the area. 
The thickets are also home to three endemic reptiles – the Urungu beaked snake (Rhinotyphlops gracilis), four-fingered skink (Sepsina tetradactyla), and Johnston's long-tailed lizard (Latastia johnstonii).

Threats and preservation
The thickets are being extensively cleared for firewood and for cultivation as the populations of the two countries grow, with 50% gone in Tanzania (which is unprotected) and 70% in Zambia, which does have some protection in the Mweru Wantipa National Park. The largest blocks of thicket remain on the northern shores of Lake Mweru Wantipa and in the eastern portion of the Zambian Itigi thicket.

A 2017 assessment found that 3,797 km², or 35%, of the ecoregion is in protected areas. Protected areas include:
 Mweru Wantipa National Park, 
 Nsumbu National Park, and 
 Kaputa Game Management Area in Zambia.

References

Afrotropical ecoregions
Ecoregions of Tanzania
Ecoregions of Zambia
Tropical and subtropical grasslands, savannas, and shrublands
Zambezian region